The Bundesleistungszentrum Kienbaum (English: Kienbaum National Training Centre) is a training facility for athletes. It is in the Kienbaum district of Grünheide (Mark) in the Oder-Spree district of Brandenburg, Germany.

History
German Olympic athletes have trained here since 1952. The facility was improved in 1980. Following German reunification, the facility opened to the general public after a period of uncertainty in 1996.

Facilities

The facility features a low-pressure underground bunker room, built for altitude training.

References

External links

Buildings and structures in Oder-Spree